Johnossi is a rock duo from Saltsjöbaden, Stockholm County, Sweden, consisting of songwriter, singer, guitarist John Engelbert and drummer, percussionist, singer Oskar "Ossi" Bonde.

History
Engelbert and Bonde first met when they were 12 and 15 years old, respectively, and started playing together as a duo in 2004. They recorded their first album after only five months as a band, and with only three live shows to their credit.
Their self-titled first album was released in January 2005 by a small Swedish indie label; it was rereleased in September 2006 by V2 Music with an additional three tracks.

Their second album, All They Ever Wanted, had its Scandinavian and Western European release in April 2008, followed by a Japanese release in 2009.

Johnossi has toured extensively in Sweden and Western Europe, both alone and with other Swedish bands such as The Soundtrack of Our Lives, Mando Diao and Sibling Sense. They also toured the US in 2007 with Shout Out Louds. In 2009, they made their first appearances in Japan, supporting The Hives.

In June 2010, the band supported Green Day at Ullevi in their home country.

In 2016 "Into the Wild" was used in the USA Network remake of Eyewitness as the opening song.

Musical style
Their music is characterized by a full guitar sound supported by Engelbert's unorthodox guitar rig and myriad effects pedals, and Bonde's straightforward beats; studio releases often feature colorful percussion accents on instruments such as tambourine, woodblock, guiro, and chimes. A variety of musical styles appear in their work, from hard rock, to blues riffs, post-punk, and even gloom-pop, though lyrical themes are almost uniformly personal and slightly angsty. Their most recent release, "Torch // Flame", showed a continued expansion of their sound and themes, with "a sense that each song has the potential to end up in an entirely different musical world than the last."

Media reference
A cover version of "Santa Monica Bay" was used in a commercial for the Scandinavian teen clothing chain "J-Store".
"Bobby" appears in the film Four Dimensions.
"Execution Song" appears in the 2008 German film The Wave ("Die Welle").
"Execution Song" appears on the video game NHL 09.
"There's a Lot of Things to Do Before You Die" appears in the 2006 Swedish film When Darkness Falls ("När mörkret faller")
An instrumental version of their song "Mavericks" was used in a promotional trailer for The Guest.
"Air Is Free" appears on the video games Dirt 4 and NHL 18.

Members
John Engelbert – vocals, guitar
Oskar "Ossi" Bonde – drums, percussion, backing vocals

Discography

Albums

EPs
2006 Execution Song (EP), V2 Music Scandinavia
2016 Air Is Free (EP), Universal
2017 Live In Berlin (EP), Bud Fox Recordings

Singles

Notes

References

External links
Official website
Johnossi at MySpace

Swedish rock music groups
Rock music duos
Swedish musical duos